Fanteakwa District is a former district that was located in Eastern Region, Ghana. Originally created as an ordinary district assembly in 1988, which was created from the former East Akim District Council. However on 15 March 2018, it was split off into two new districts: Fanteakwa North District (capital: Begoro) and Fanteakwa South District (capital: Osino). The district assembly was located in the central part of Eastern Region and had Begoro as its capital town.

List of settlements

Sources
 
 District: Fanteakwa District
 Fanteakwa Foundation

External links
Map of Fanteakwa District

References

Districts of the Eastern Region (Ghana)